Santa Cruz Municipality may refer to:
Bolivia
 Santa Cruz de la Sierra, in Santa Cruz Department
Mexico
 Santa Cruz Municipality, Sonora
Philippines
Santa Cruz, Davao del Sur
Santa Cruz, Ilocos Sur
Santa Cruz, Laguna
Santa Cruz, Marinduque
Santa Cruz, Occidental Mindoro
Santa Cruz, Zambales

Municipality name disambiguation pages